Utley-Council House is a historic home located near Apex, Wake County, North Carolina.  It was built about 1820, and is an asymmetrical, two-story, three bay, frame Federal period dwelling. It has a hall-and-parlor plan. Also on the property is a contributing mortise-and-tenon smokehouse (c. 1820s).

It was listed on the National Register of Historic Places (NRHP) in 2002.

References

Houses on the National Register of Historic Places in North Carolina
Federal architecture in North Carolina
Houses completed in 1820
Houses in Wake County, North Carolina
National Register of Historic Places in Wake County, North Carolina